Bruno Gonçalves Kischinhevsky, sometimes known as just Bruno (born 9 August 1994) is a Brazilian football player of Israeli descent. He last played for FC Dordrecht.

Club career
He made his Eerste Divisie debut for FC Dordrecht on 18 August 2017 in a game against Fortuna Sittard.

References

External links
 

1994 births
Footballers from Rio de Janeiro (city)
Brazilian people of Israeli descent
Living people
Brazilian footballers
Madureira Esporte Clube players
FC Dordrecht players
Brazilian expatriate footballers
Expatriate footballers in the Netherlands
Eerste Divisie players
Association football midfielders